Siek is an Amt ("collective municipality") in the district of Stormarn, in Schleswig-Holstein, Germany. The seat of the Amt is in Siek.

The Amt Siek consists of the following municipalities:

Braak 
Brunsbek 
Hoisdorf 
Siek
Stapelfeld

Ämter in Schleswig-Holstein